The Erwin House (also known as the Syfrett House) is a historic site in Greenwood, Florida. It is located on Fort Road, east of SR 71. On June 5, 1974, it was added to the U.S. National Register of Historic Places.

The house was first home to John A. Syfrett and other small farmers, who purchased  of Greenwood land in 1839. Though not among the landed gentry, these respected farmers were important to the agricultural output of Jackson County. The Syfrett family's prosperity is indicated by several outbuildings: a barn, smoke house, carriage house, office building, and small slave cabin.

The Syfrett farm was sold to Mary Roberts in 1851. The title followed through the possession of Henry Bryan to Dr. Franklin Hart in 1855. The house was purchased by M.F. Erwin in 1861 and has remained in the family name.

References
 Jackson County listings at National Register of Historic Places
 Jackson County listings at Florida's Office of Cultural and Historical Programs

External links
 Historical Marker Database - Erwin House

Houses on the National Register of Historic Places in Florida
Houses in Jackson County, Florida
Vernacular architecture in Florida
National Register of Historic Places in Jackson County, Florida
Slave cabins and quarters in the United States